Iowa County Courthouse may refer to:

Iowa County Courthouse (Iowa), Marengo, Iowa
Iowa County Courthouse (Wisconsin), Dodgeville, Wisconsin